This is a list of Engine Sentai Go-onger episodes. Each episode is called a 
, or "GP" for short. The colored line preceding an episode entry indicates which of the Engines is narrating the episode.

Episodes


{| class="wikitable" width="98%"
|- style="border-bottom:8px solid #000000"style="border-bottom:8px solid #FF5F5F"
! width="4%" | GP# !! Title !! Writer !! Original airdate
|-|colspan=4 bgcolor=#e6e9ff|

Allies of Justice

|-|colspan=4 bgcolor=#e6e9ff|

Reckless Guys

|-|colspan=4 bgcolor=#e6e9ff|

Basic Investigation

|-|colspan=4 bgcolor=#e6e9ff|

Engine Trouble

|-|colspan=4 bgcolor=#e6e9ff|

Sometimes a Mother!?

|-|colspan=4 bgcolor=#e6e9ff|

The Maiden's Heart

|-|colspan=4 bgcolor=#e6e9ff|

Partner Amigo

|-|colspan=4 bgcolor=#e6e9ff|

The Greatest Miracle

|-|colspan=4 bgcolor=#e6e9ff|

Tomorrow is There

|-|colspan=4 bgcolor=#e6e9ff|

Starting Alright

|-|colspan=4 bgcolor=#e6e9ff|

Airwave Jack

|-|colspan=4 bgcolor=#e6e9ff|

Sōsuke Banki!?

|-|colspan=4 bgcolor=#e6e9ff|

Tank Full of Chivalry

|-|colspan=4 bgcolor=#e6e9ff|

Doki Doki Every Day

|-|colspan=4 bgcolor=#e6e9ff|

Engine Stall

|-|colspan=4 bgcolor=#e6e9ff|

Honor Recovery

|-|colspan=4 bgcolor=#e6e9ff|

Wings of Justice

|-|colspan=4 bgcolor=#e6e9ff|

Commoner Hero

|-|colspan=4 bgcolor=#e6e9ff|

Gunpei's True Intentions

|-|colspan=4 bgcolor=#e6e9ff|

Sibling Battle!?

|-|colspan=4 bgcolor=#e6e9ff|

Childish Guys

|-|colspan=4 bgcolor=#e6e9ff|

Final Request

|-|colspan=4 bgcolor=#e6e9ff|

Reckless Flash

|-|colspan=4 bgcolor=#e6e9ff|

First Smile

|-|colspan=4 bgcolor=#e6e9ff|

Goodbye Mother

|-|colspan=4 bgcolor=#e6e9ff|

Love Affair

|-|colspan=4 bgcolor=#e6e9ff|

Granddaughter Hant!?

|-|colspan=4 bgcolor=#e6e9ff|

Partner Gunpei

|-|colspan=4 bgcolor=#e6e9ff|

Stop Hiroto

|-|colspan=4 bgcolor=#e6e9ff|

Friendship's Punch

|-|colspan=4 bgcolor=#e6e9ff|

Idol Debut

|-|colspan=4 bgcolor=#e6e9ff|

Search for Treasure

|-|colspan=4 bgcolor=#e6e9ff|

Primeval Engines

|-|colspan=4 bgcolor=#e6e9ff|

Devilish Woman

|-|colspan=4 bgcolor=#e6e9ff|

Engines' Bonds

|-|colspan=4 bgcolor=#e6e9ff|

Sōsuke… Eternally

|-|colspan=4 bgcolor=#e6e9ff|

Engine Banki!?

|-|colspan=4 bgcolor=#e6e9ff|

The Maidens' Seriousness

|-|colspan=4 bgcolor=#e6e9ff|

Nostalgic Children

|-|colspan=4 bgcolor=#e6e9ff|

Shogun Revival

|-|colspan=4 bgcolor=#e6e9ff|

Advanced Childcare

|-|colspan=4 bgcolor=#e6e9ff|

Campus Secret

|-|colspan=4 bgcolor=#e6e9ff|

Year-End Big Cleanup

|-|colspan=4 bgcolor=#e6e9ff|

Protect Christmas Eve

|-|colspan=4 bgcolor=#e6e9ff|

Hatsuyume Plans!?

|-|colspan=4 bgcolor=#e6e9ff|

Runaway Bomper

|-|colspan=4 bgcolor=#e6e9ff|

Ministry Shake-Up

|-|colspan=4 bgcolor=#e6e9ff|

Justice Dissolution

|-|colspan=4 bgcolor=#e6e9ff|

Final Battle

|-|colspan=4 bgcolor=#e6e9ff|

Road of Justice

|}

References

Engine Sentai Go-onger